Sebastião Carlos da Silva (born 8 March 1948), known as just Tião, is a Brazilian footballer. He competed in the men's tournament at the 1968 Summer Olympics.

References

External links
 

1948 births
Living people
Brazilian footballers
Brazil international footballers
Olympic footballers of Brazil
Footballers at the 1968 Summer Olympics
People from Vitória, Espírito Santo
Association football forwards
Sportspeople from Espírito Santo